EnterTRAINment Junction is an indoor model railroad display located in West Chester Township, Ohio. This 25,000 square foot display consists of over 90 G-scale trains encompassing the early era of American railroading, the middle era, and the modern era. The facility also includes the American Railroading Museum, an expo center, and a fun house. The display takes its name from an O gauge layout that existed in the Mall of America from 1992 to 2000.

History 

EnterTRAINment Junction was a result of the vision of its owner, Don Oeters. Oeters, a successful businessman and model railroad enthusiast, wanted to create the world's largest model train display in an amusement park-like setting. He commissioned Bruce Robinson, whose resume' includes the Ripley's Believe It Or Not Museums, to create the concept drawings for this massive project. Major construction began in early 2007 with the first track being installed in the Spring of the same year. EnterTRAINment Junction opened to the public on August 1, 2008.

Areas

Main lobby 
The main lobby of EnterTRAINment Junction is themed to a typical 1930s railroad town. The lobby consists of several party rooms, a cafe', gift shop, and offices - all of which have a façade that creates the look and feel of a classic town.

Train Journey 
The Train Journey is the main attraction at EnterTRAINment Junction. This 25,000 square foot train display is billed as the world's largest indoor train display. Over 60,000 man hours were put into this massive display that features intricate models and over 90 G-scale model trains. Each G-scale train engine is roughly a 1/24 scale of a real train engine and the nearly 1,200 box cars are approximately the size of a loaf of bread. Interactive buttons throughout the path allows viewers to control lights, sounds, and moving model pieces. The entire display is separated into three sections displaying the history of rail transport in the United States: the Early Era (1860s through the 1900s), the Middle Era (1940s through the 1950s), and the Modern Era (1970s to the present time).

Early Era (1860s through 1900s) 

The first section of the Train Journey explores the Early Era of American Railroading. This section features several trains that were typical to the era.

The trains traverse a mountainous region that represents the lawless labor force that was responsible for the construction of America's first railroad. The section features several early railroad towns including a 6' paddle boat and an 11' tall pouring waterfall. The trains pass through tunnels in a rolling hillside, passing buildings and homes that would be found during that time period.

Middle Era (1940s through 1950s) 

The Middle Era section of the Train Journey displays how railroading progressed throughout the middle of the 20th century. This area displays a 1950s American town that would have benefited from the newer technologies in railroading. In addition to the freight and passenger trains reflecting the technology of the time, the town also features moving street cars and a subway system.

Modern Era (1970s to the present) 

The Modern Era section of the Train Journey displays railroading as it is today. This section features skyscrapers that are representative of such companies as Boeing, 3M, as well as Seattle's Space Needle. The trains look like the large diesel machines you would find today. Much of the emphasis on rail traffic was converted from passenger transit to cargo transit and that is reflected in the area. Interactive models include a railway turntable, a crane for unloading cargo from the trains, and a hot air balloon.

Coney Island 

EnterTRAINment Junction features a scale model of the historic Coney Island (Cincinnati, Ohio). This display is a recreation of Coney Island as it was seen in the late 1960s. This includes a working model of the famous Shooting Star roller coaster, a 4' tall Ferris Wheel, and several other rides and attractions that would have been found at Coney Island at the time. Due to space limitations some creative license was used in the layout of the model, however all of the models in the display are accurate to the period.

Great Train Expo Center 
The Great Train Expo Center is a large multi-purpose facility within EnterTRAINment Junction. During the months of January and March through August, several additional train displays including one donated by the musician Neil Young are on display. A large replica of the Mount Adams Incline can be found in this area as well. During February, the outdoor electric train is brought into the Expo Center for kids to enjoy. The area is also used for special activities for annual activities such as the indoor pumpkin patch for Jack o'Lantern Junction and a special Holiday Trains Expo during Christmas at the Junction. It is also home to the Cincinnati chapter of the National Railroad Historical Society.

In the rear of the expo center, guests can watch volunteers build, repair, and paint the trains and models that will be on display in the Train Journey.

Imagination Junction 
Imagination Junction is a 5,000 square foot play area specifically for young children. This area features a climbable tube maze, a kids carousel, and other train themed activities. During the warmer months kids can ride an outdoor narrow gauge train with an electric engine that pulls two cars through 1000' of track. Additionally there is the Kids' Express, an outdoor hand-cranked kids train that traverses 400' of track. Both the electric train and the Kids' Express are an additional charge.

A-Maze-N Funhouse 

A-Maze-N Funhouse is a section of EnterTRAINment Junction that features five family-friendly mazes with different optical and physical illusions. The main midway is themed to an old-time circus. Within it are five different "tents" that all house a separate maze.

The first maze is the Mirror Maze and is the largest house of mirrors in North America. Kids can enter and experience dead ends, optical illusions, and disorientation from being surrounded by hundreds of mirrors.

The second maze is called the Clown College and features several illusions such as bent mirrors, objects that seem to defy gravity, and an Ames Room.

The third maze is called Curtain Chaos. Hanging curtains surround guests as they try to figure out which way progresses them to the next room, and which way simply dead ends at a wall.

Outer Limits: Journey Through the Black Hole is a space themed maze. While featuring things such as glowing stars, light effects, and a vortex tunnel, it also has interesting facts and educational pieces about outer space.

The newest maze opened in 2012 and is called Crazy Caper. The story of the maze is that you are on a mission to get the Ring Master's key, which is hidden somewhere in the tent. Along the way you encounter several "booby traps," crazy alarms, and optical illusions such as a Pepper's Ghost effect.

It's A Marbleous Life 

In the summer of 2019, EnterTRAINment Junction opened the world's largest marble (toy) display, which is the second largest marble museum in the world. This was done in conjunction with husband and wife marble enthusiasts Larry and Cathy Svacina.  Marbles in this display date back to the 1800s and include games, collectables, memorabilia, and fun facts about marbles and their multi-generational history.

Annual events

Jack o'Lantern Junction 
Jack o'Lantern Junction is an annual family friendly Halloween Celebration at EnterTRAINment Junction. Families are invited to walk through a trick or treat maze that features family friendly ghosts, skeletons, and more. The outdoor train rides are open with a special Halloween theme.

Christmas at the Junction 
Christmas at the Junction is a Holiday themed attraction at EnterTRAINment Junction that runs during the Christmas Season. A special attraction is added to the Fun House Junction area of the property that is themed to the North Pole. Families are invited to walk through this attraction on their way to meet Santa Claus. Along the way they encounter Audio Animatronic penguins, reindeer, elves, and even falling snow. The Great Train Expo Center is opened to the public for free during this time of year and features several miniature train displays on snow covered mountainsides.

Christmas in July 
Christmas in July is an annual celebration around the 25th of each July in which the Christmas activities from Christmas at the Junction open for the whole month.

Everything Thomas 
Everything Thomas is an annual event that features PBS's Thomas The Tank Engine. Kids are invited to look for small Thomas toys throughout the Train Journey section of EnterTRAINment Junction. Additionally, Thomas themed attractions are added to the Imagination Junction section of the complex. Special Thomas crafts are also added to the A-Maze-N Funhouse.

Escape The Room Challenge
In the Spring of 2015, EnterTRAINment Junction announced the opening of its sister business Escape The Room Challenge.  Situated on the same property as their main complex, it occupies a separate building connected by the main parking lot.  Operating as a separate facility, it offers four unique escape room experiences as well as a virtual reality escape room. All games last one hour. As of 2020, Escape the Room has closed permanently.

Esmeralda's Curse
Themed to a gypsy fortune teller's parlor.  You have one hour to escape before the curse steals your soul.  This is a 4 out of 4 in difficulty and the most difficult room.

Escape The Mob
The mob has stolen your priceless family heirloom.  You must infiltrate their shipping warehouse and escape before the mob arrives.  This is considered medium difficulty.

Double Agent Dilemma
Also a medium difficulty, your mission is to expose a double agent and then disarm the bomb that they have planted in the agency.

Uncle Ernie's Millions
In February 2017, Escape The Room Challenge opened Uncle Ernie's Millions.  The story involves your rich uncle passing and you are tasked with finding his will in order to inherit his $50 million.

DeComposed VR
In April 2019, Escape The Room Challenge opened DeComposed, the first virtual reality escape room experience in the region. DeComposed consists of up to four players who can work together and interact virtually through the in-game experience.

See also
 Holiday Junction

References

Model railway shows and exhibitions
Tourist attractions in Butler County, Ohio
2008 establishments in Ohio
Railroad museums in Ohio